Slim Buttes National Forest was established by the General Land Office as Slim Buttes Forest Reserve in South Dakota on March 5, 1904 with . After the transfer of federal forests to the U.S. Forest Service in 1905, it became a National Forest on March 4, 1907. On July 1, 1908 it was absorbed by Sioux National Forest and the name was discontinued.

The forest today comprises the Slim Buttes unit of the Sioux Ranger District of Custer National Forest, southeast of Buffalo.
Points of interest include the Reva Gap Campground along HWY 20, The Castles National Natural Landmark adjacent to the campground and the old Jesse Elliott Ranger Station.

References

External links
Sioux Ranger District, Custer National Forest
Forest History Society
Forest History Society:Listing of the National Forests of the United States Text from Davis, Richard C., ed. Encyclopedia of American Forest and Conservation History. New York: Macmillan Publishing Company for the Forest History Society, 1983. Vol. II, pp. 743-788.

Former National Forests of South Dakota
Protected areas of Harding County, South Dakota